The 2014 United Football League was the fifth season of the UFL since its establishment as a semi-professional league in 2009. The UFL League kicked off on Saturday, January 11 with 9 teams in Division I and 12 teams in Division II.

Stallion was the defending champion, having won the Division 1 of the 2013 United Football League season.

Global outclassed Pachanga Diliman 7-2 on 12 June 2014 to win the 2014 United Football League title with three games to spare.

Teams
The relegated Philippine Air Force from 2013 UFL Division 1  was replaced by Team Socceroo as the champion of 2013 UFL Division 2. The Manila Nomads voluntarily stepped down from Division I and played in Division II for this season citing its inability to comply with Division I's Foreigner Cap rule, which dictates that there should be a minimum of six Filipino players on the pitch at all times. Manila Jeepney and Ceres made their debuts i the league's Division II. In this season, the Division I played a triple round-robin system, increasing games from 18 to 24.

Division 1

Clubs

Managerial changes

Venues

League table

Results

Matchday 1-16

Matchday 17-24

Top goalscorers
Correct as of 23:00, June 24, 2014
Source: UFL Phil

Own goals

Hat-tricks

 ‡ Player scored more than three goals

Division 2

Clubs

Managerial changes

Venues

League table

Results

Top goalscorers
Correct as of 23:00, June 24, 2014
Source: UFL Phil

Own goals

Hat-tricks

 ‡ Player scored more than three goals

Season awards

Team awards
The following teams are awarded by the United Football League in the ceremony.

Individual awards
The following players are awarded by the United Football League Committee in the ceremony.

References

External links
Official website

 
United Football League (Philippines) seasons
1
Phil
Phil